Street of No Return is a 1989 crime film directed by Samuel Fuller and starring Keith Carradine and Valentina Vargas. It is based on the 1954 novel with the same title written by David Goodis.

Cast
Keith Carradine as Michael
Valentina Vargas as Celia
Bill Duke as Lieutenant Borel
Andréa Ferréol as Rhoda
Bernard Fresson as Morin

References

External links

1989 films
1989 crime drama films
Films directed by Samuel Fuller
French crime drama films
Films based on American novels
Films set in the United States
Films shot in Lisbon
French neo-noir films
English-language French films
1980s English-language films
1980s French films